Time I is the second full-length album by the Finnish melodic death metal band Wintersun. It was originally scheduled for release in November 2006, but ended up being marred by many delays. It was released on October 19, 2012 via Nuclear Blast.

Background
As of the commencement of recording, Jari Mäenpää stated that the album length would run over 65 minutes, and that it would be a concept album. Furthermore, according to Mäenpää, the album's sound was to be highly intricate. Each song was said to contain about 200 tracks.

The album's complexity was one of the main reasons for its slow production process. As of April 2007, drums, bass and all the guitars had been recorded. Kai Hahto stated on the official site that due to studio intervention, progress was being made, but also announced that they would not be giving any more release dates at that time, so as not to disappoint fans if they were not met.

As a teaser for the upcoming album, Wintersun ended their Metalcamp 2008 set with a 15-second preview of "Sons of Winter and Stars".

On February 27, 2009, Mäenpää announced through Wintersun's official website that the band would cancel all their live appearances, including Bloodstock Open Air and Summer Breeze, in order to make way for the slow progress of the album.

On April 26, 2010, Mäenpää announced on the Wintersun message board that "Land of Snow and Sorrow" was completely finished and that the tracks "Storm" and "Silver Leaves" would be done soon.

On November 17, 2010, the band members announced on Wintersun's official website that the album was close to being completed for the most part and that the synths and orchestrations might be finished around December 2010/January 2011. Jari intended to start mixing the album afterwards.

On December 25, 2010, Jari stated on the Winter Madness message board that "Silver Leaves" was finished except for some orchestrations. On December 26, 2010, Jari stated that three songs are finished and ready for mixing, and that four songs have "bits and pieces" missing, including vocals.

On March 19, 2011, Jari announced via the Winter Madness message board that mixing had been put on hold until late summer at the earliest due to various complications, ranging from a lack of 64-bit DAW plugins to noisy nearby construction.

On March 16, 2012, Mäenpää announced via Wintersun's official website that Time was nearly finished and would be released in late summer of 2012.

Two months later, on May 25, 2012, Wintersun announced that Time was to be split into two halves and released separately, with the titles of Time I and Time II. At the time, the mixing process of Time I was underway and scheduled to be finished around July 2012. The first album was released in October 2012, with the second album tentatively planned for release at an unknown date in 2013.

A studio trailer was posted to the Nuclear Blast YouTube channel on July 4, 2012, revealing the release date of Time I to be October 19, 2012 in Europe and October 22, 2012 in North America.

On October 17, 2012, the album was made available for streaming on the band's website.

Music
Concerning the album and potential Japanese influence, Jari Mäenpää stated in a 2004 interview, "Right now I'm exploring some Japanese style melodies, so beautiful and magical. You can probably hear some in the next album." The introduction track is confirmed to have Japanese influence.

Track listing 

1 Limited edition contains a hidden track (03:50) after the last track. This contains acappella parts reminiscent of the hidden track on the limited editions of the first two Ensiferum albums.

Personnel 
 Jari Mäenpää − vocals, guitar, computer, keyboard programming
 Teemu Mäntysaari − guitar, backing vocals
 Jukka Koskinen − bass, backing vocals
 Kai Hahto − drums

Sequel 
Wintersun has announced that they will have a sequel to this album sometime in the future, but has been delayed due to not having a studio, instead they recorded a new album called The Forest Seasons. Time II is still scheduled to be released but there is no definite release date.

References 

Concept albums
Wintersun albums
Nuclear Blast albums
2012 albums